Jazz Man Records was an American record company and independent record label devoted to traditional New Orleans-style jazz. David Stuart (né David Ashford Stuart; 1910–1984) founded the label in 1941 and sold it to Marili Morden and Nesuhi Ertegun.  The label and its namesake – Jazz Man Record Shop, in Hollywood – were in the vanguard of an international revival of traditional jazz in the 1940s.

History

Jazz Man Records was founded in 1941 by David Stuart, owner of the Jazz Man Record Shop in Hollywood, California. The label was an offshoot of the shop, established in 1939 as the only shop on the West Coast that specialized in used 78s for jazz collectors. Stuart was a purist who felt that traditional New Orleans jazz was the real jazz. He preserved and promoted the traditional jazz music that had fallen out of favor in the late 1920s, and regarded the swing music that had eclipsed it with contempt.

Stuart modeled Jazz Man Records after Commodore Records, whose issues were released by a comparable record shop operating in Manhattan from 1938. He adopted its style of printing the names and instrumentation of the personnel on the label. The label also bore the address of the Jazz Man Record Shop, the exclusive sales outlet. Lester Koenig and Stuart produced the first recordings by Lu Watters' Yerba Buena Jazz Band December 19–20, 1941. A second recording session with the Watters band was produced in March 1942.

In June 1942, Stuart produced a historic recording session in New Orleans with Bunk Johnson, putting together a group he called Bunk Johnson's Original Superior Band.

In December 1942, Jazz Man Records issued four unreleased sides by Jelly Roll Morton, recorded in 1938, in partnership with Nesuhi Ertegun. Ertegun had acquired the solo piano recordings, made in Washington, D.C., while Morton was being interviewed by Alan Lomax, from a private collection in 1941.

Ertegun purchased Jazz Man Records from David Stuart in late 1946. In January 1947, Jazz Man record labels were redesigned and a dark green color, matching that of Crescent Records. Ertegun retired the Crescent label.

On January 15, 1952, Jazz Man Records sold its masters to Lester Koenig's Good Time Jazz Records for $5,500. Recordings were produced on the Jazz Man label through 1954. The last was an album by Joe Venuti and Tony Romano (Jazz Man LP LJ-336), recorded in October 1954 and released the following month.

Select discography
The Jazz Man Records discography is available online from the Jazz Discography Project and is further detailed in Cary Ginell's 2010 book, Hot Jazz for Sale: Hollywood's Jazz Man Record Shop.

See also
 Crescent Records

References

External links
 6. Marili Morden: "This is the real jazz" at Gene Deitch, Roll the Credits! (archived at the Internet Archive)
 1939 Jazz Man Record Shop at The Kid Ory Archive

Record labels established in 1941
American independent record labels
Defunct record labels of the United States
Jazz record labels